Wamai language may be:

Askunu language, a language spoken in Afghanistan
Mountain Koiali language, a language spoken in Papua New Guinea